During the 1959–60 season Hibernian, a football club based in Edinburgh, came seventh out of 18 clubs in the Scottish First Division.

Scottish First Division

Final League table

Scottish League Cup

Group stage

Group 4 final table

Scottish Cup

Friendly matches
On 2 November 1959, Hibs played a friendly against Middlesbrough at Easter Road. Joe Baker scored a hat-trick for Hibs in a 6–6 draw.

See also
List of Hibernian F.C. seasons

References

External links
Hibernian 1959/1960 results and fixtures, Soccerbase

Hibernian F.C. seasons
Hibernian